James Gandy (1619–1689) was an English portrait-painter, one of the earliest native English painters.

Life
Gandy was probably a native of Exeter. He is said to have been a pupil of Anthony van Dyck, and to have acquired some of his style; he may have painted the drapery in Van Dyck's pictures. In 1661 he was taken to Ireland by his patron, the Duke of Ormonde, and remained there until his death. He was father of William Gandy.

Works
He executed a number of copies of portraits by Van Dyck for the duke's collection at Kilkenny, some of which were sold at the dispersal of the collection, as original works. His principal portraits were done in Ireland, and remained there. One of the Duke of Ormonde was in the possession of the Earl of Leicester.

Further reading
Baring-Gould, Sabine, Devon Characters and Strange Events, London, 1908, Preface, p.vii

References

Attribution

1619 births
1689 deaths
17th-century English painters
English male painters
Artists from Exeter
English portrait painters